Pamela Griffiths is a former international lawn bowls competitor for Wales.

In 1988, she won the bronze medal in the fours at the 1988 World Outdoor Bowls Championship in Auckland with Margaret Pomeroy, Mary Hughes and Linda Parker.

Two years later, she represented Wales at the 1990 Commonwealth Games in the pairs and was part of the coaching staff during the 2006 Commonwealth Games.

References

Date of birth missing (living people)
Welsh female bowls players
Bowls players at the 1990 Commonwealth Games
Living people
Year of birth missing (living people)
Commonwealth Games competitors for Wales